Laura Henderson (6 December 1863 – 29 November 1944) born Laura Forster, rose to prominence in the 1930s when, as a wealthy and eccentric widow, she founded the Windmill Theatre in London's Great Windmill Street, in partnership with Vivian van Damm. With Henderson as owner and van Damm as manager, they turned the theatre into a British institution, famed for its pioneering tableaux vivants of motionless female nudity, and for having "never closed" during the Blitz.

Biography
Laura Henderson was the well-travelled socialite wife of a jute merchant, Robert Henderson. The couple lost their only son, Alec Henderson, in 1915, in France, during the First World War. Her husband died in 1919, leaving her a wealthy widow.

In 1931, she bought the Palais de Luxe cinema building and hired architect Howard Jones to restyle the interior to create a tiny, one-tier theatre, renamed the Windmill. The Windmill Theatre opened on 22 June 1931 as a playhouse, but it was not profitable and soon returned to showing films. Henderson then hired Vivian Van Damm, and they produced Revudeville, a programme of continuous variety with 18 entertainment acts. This also was a commercial failure, so they included nudity to emulate the Folies Bergère and the Moulin Rouge in Paris.  The key element was Van Damm's exploitation of a legal loophole (or zone of tolerance) that nude statues could not be banned on moral grounds, and this led to the legendary "Windmill Girls" who appeared completely nude but stood completely still, so as to emulate nude statuary. The theatre stayed open during World War II despite demands from the government for her to shut it down.

Death
On her death in 1944, Laura Henderson bequeathed the Windmill to "My Dear Bop", Vivian Van Damm. In his 1952 autobiography, Van Damm described her as "a great strain on one's nerves, patience and tact".

Portrayal in media
Laura Henderson was portrayed by Judi Dench in the 2005 film Mrs Henderson Presents, for which Dench was nominated for the Academy Award for Best Actress. The film was later adapted into a stage musical.

References

English theatre managers and producers
Women theatre managers and producers
English socialites
1864 births
1944 deaths